The Colonial families of Maryland were the leading families in the Province of Maryland. Several also had interests in the Colony of Virginia, and the two are sometimes referred to as the Chesapeake Colonies.

Founders and scions

See also
 First Families of Virginia
 American gentry
 Hammond-Harwood House
 Whitehall (Annapolis, Maryland)
 Tulip Hill
 Pimlico Race Course
 Preakness Stakes
 History of White Americans in Baltimore
 Old Stock Americans

References

Further reading

External links 

 Search engine of Maryland's families of early settlers

 Hester Dorsey Richardson. Side-lights on Maryland history: with sketches of early Maryland families. Vol. II. Williams and Wilkins. 1913.
 Joshua Dorsey Warfield. The Founders of Anne Arundel and Howard Counties, Maryland: A genealogical and biographical review from wills, deeds and church records. Kohn & Pollock. 1905.

Province of Maryland
Families from Maryland
People of colonial Maryland